Stéphane Chapuisat (born 28 June 1969) is a Swiss former professional footballer who played as a striker.

A prolific goalscorer for both club and country (for which he appeared more than 100 times), he spent most of his career with Bundesliga club Borussia Dortmund. He represented Switzerland at the 1994 World Cup and two European Championships.

Chapuisat  is currently the sporting director of BSC Young Boys.

Club career
Born in Lausanne, Chapuisat started his professional career with hometown club FC Lausanne-Sport, moving in January 1991 to Bundesliga's Bayer Uerdingen and switching to powerhouse Borussia Dortmund in that summer.

Chapuisat scored 20 league goals in his first season, two short of Torjäger Fritz Walter of eventual champions VfB Stuttgart. He stayed with Borussia until 1999, conquering back-to-back titles – although he played sparingly in 1995–96 due to injuries – and adding the following campaign's UEFA Champions League, where he netted three in ten games during the victorious run.

Chapuisat then transferred to Grasshopper Club Zürich, playing there for three years and helped them winning the league title in 2001. In 2002, he moved to fellow Swiss Super League side BSC Young Boys, before rejoining Lausanne now in the second division, retiring at 37 with 106 goals in 228 Bundesliga matches to his credit; he was also voted Swiss Footballer of the Year four times (1992, 1993, 1994 and 2001).

In November 2003, to celebrate UEFA's Jubilee, Chapuisat was selected as the Golden Player of Switzerland by the Swiss Football Association as their most outstanding player of the past 50 years.

International career
Chapuisat scored 21 goals in 103 caps for Switzerland, and played in the 1994 FIFA World Cup, UEFA Euro 1996 and Euro 2004.

In the 1994 World Cup, appearing in four complete contests as the nation reached the round-of-16, he scored in a 4–1 win over Romania on 22 June.

Personal life
Chapuisat's father, Pierre-Albert, was also a professional footballer. A defender, he too represented Lausanne and the national team, going on to have a lengthy career as a manager.

International goals

Honours
Borussia Dortmund
Bundesliga: 1994–95, 1995–96
DFB-Supercup: 1995, 1996
UEFA Champions League: 1996–97
Intercontinental Cup: 1997

Grasshoppers
Swiss Super League: 2000–01

Individual
Ballon d'Or: 1991 (13th), 1992 (9th), 1993 (9th)
kicker Bundesliga Team of the Season: 1991–92
Swiss Super League top scorer: 2000–01, 2003–04
UEFA Jubilee Awards – Greatest Swiss Footballer of the last 50 Years: 2003

See also
 List of men's footballers with 100 or more international caps

References

External links

1969 births
Living people
Swiss-French people
Sportspeople from Lausanne
Swiss men's footballers
Association football forwards
Swiss Super League players
Swiss Challenge League players
FC Lausanne-Sport players
Grasshopper Club Zürich players
BSC Young Boys players
Bundesliga players
KFC Uerdingen 05 players
Borussia Dortmund players
Switzerland international footballers
1994 FIFA World Cup players
UEFA Euro 1996 players
UEFA Euro 2004 players
Swiss expatriate footballers
Expatriate footballers in Germany
Swiss expatriate sportspeople in Germany
Kicker-Torjägerkanone Award winners
FIFA Century Club
UEFA Golden Players
UEFA Champions League winning players